The Asian highland shrew (Suncus montanus) is a species of mammal in the family Soricidae. It is found in India and Sri Lanka. Its habitat is subtropical or tropical dry forests.

Description
The head and body reach  in length. It is dark bluish-brown to black above and paler below. The pelage may be bluish-gray at the base. Some adults are reddish brown. The fur is soft and velvety and hairless areas are pinkish.

References

Suncus
Mammals of India
Mammals of Sri Lanka
Taxonomy articles created by Polbot
Mammals described in 1850